Swammerdamia passerella is a moth of the  family Yponomeutidae. It is found in Great Britain, Fennoscandia, Poland, Estonia and northern Russia.

The wingspan is 10–12 mm. Adults are on wing from June to July.

The larvae feed on Betula nana. Young larvae mine the leaves of their host plant. Later, they live freely under a slight web. Mining larvae can be found in June.

References

Moths described in 1839
Yponomeutidae
Moths of Europe